Ziana Zain No. 1s Live is the second live album by Malaysian singer Ziana Zain released in 2003. This album is the first album produced by Ziana's new label, EMI. It includes two new songs which were recorded in studio. The album also features Ziana's first attempt of composing her own song, Bukan, which received positive feedback and garnered notable awards.

Track listing
 "Lembah Asmara" (New Song) (Ajai, Slen) — 4:15
 "Madah Berhelah 2003" (Saari Amri) — 4:37
 "Anggapanmu / Kemelut Di Muara Kasih / Korban Cinta"  (Asmin Mudin, Saari Amri, Johari Teh) — 8:19
 "Syurga Di Hati Kita" (LY, Baiduri) — 6:47
 "Setia Ku Di Sini" (Salman, Nurbisa II) — 4:45
 "Kalau Mencari Teman" (Razman, Habsah Hassan) — 4:16
 "Puncak Kasih" (Adnan Abu Hassan, Maya Sari) — 5:42
 "Menadah Gerimis / Aku Cintakan Mu" (Azmeer, Johari Teh) — 9:29
 "Kekal" (Saari Amri) — 4:22
 "Bukan" (New Song) (Ziana Zain, Amran Omar) — 4:25

Awards

External links
 Fan Site

2003 live albums
Malay-language live albums
EMI Records live albums
Ziana Zain live albums